Oliver Bullough,  (born 1977) is a British writer.

Early life
He grew up on a sheep farm in Mid Wales, and studied history at Oxford University.

Career
After history finals at Oxford, Bullough acted in a friend's Edinburgh Fringe play. In 1999, he bought the Lonely Planet Guide to Russia, later, took a Russian language course, and got hired by a Saint Petersburg English language magazine. After a year, Bullough got hired by The Times of Central Asia, in Bishkek, Kyrgyzstan.

Bullough later worked as a journalist for Reuters. He also  covered the war in Chechnya.

Works
He is best known for his books Let Our Fame Be Great, nominated for the Orwell Prize, (set in the Caucasus mountains) and The Last Man in Russia, nominated for the Dolman Prize and won the Overseas Press Club's Cornelius Ryan Award. Later books focused on financial crime, Moneyland: Why Thieves And Crooks Now Rule The World And How To Take It Back, Butler to the World: How Britain Helps the World's Worst People Launder Money, Commit Crimes, and Get Away with Anything

His work has appeared at Institute for War and Peace Reporting, and in GQ, Granta, and The Guardian.

Bibliography 
 Butler to the World (2022). Profile Books. 
 Moneyland (2018). Profile Books.

Personal life
He returned to Britain in 2006, and lives in East London.

References

External links
 
 

1977 births
Living people
British writers